MIM (Laboratoire Musique et Informatique de Marseille - the Music and informatics laboratory of Marseille) is a multidisciplinary group (composers, visual artists, video artists, scientists). It was founded in 1984 by the French composer and musicologist Marcel Frémiot who wanted to create in Marseille a tool for reflection on music and contemporary musical practices.

In 1991, a new research program is developed, with François Delalande as research director (Groupe de recherches musicales - INA / GRM) on problematics of the musical time, a program born of the concern of composers faced with the difficulties approach and reception of contemporary music.

This research work will generate a new musical analysis tool called UST (Unités Sémiotiques Temporelles - Temporal Sémiotic Units). In this year (1991), the French composer Michel Philippot becomes president of MIM.

Thereafter, the MIM will develop around the concept of UST a lot of collaborations with research structures musical or not. For example, with the Electronic Music Foundation (New York), Journal, the Laboratoire de Neurocybernétique Cellulaire (CNRS) (Laboratory of cellular neurocybernétics), the Institut de Neurosciences Cognitives de la Méditerranée (Cognitive neuroscience institute of the Mediterranean), the Laboratoire Cognitions Humaine et ARTificielle (CHART - Univ. Paris 8) (Laboratory human and artificial cognitions), the association "Mots-voir" (numerical poetry), the laboratory Paragraphe (Univ. Paris 8).

References

External links
 The website of MIM

The website of Transitoire Observable, grouping of numerical artists

Research institutes in France